Jogi Ram Sihag is an Indian politician. He was elected to the Haryana Legislative Assembly from Barwala in the 2019 Haryana Legislative Assembly election as a member of the Jannayak Janta Party.

References

Living people
Jannayak Janta Party politicians
People from Hisar district
Haryana MLAs 2019–2024
Year of birth missing (living people)